The 1944 United States Senate election in Connecticut was held on November 7, 1944.

Incumbent Republican Senator John A. Danaher ran for re-election to a second term in office but was defeated by Democratic attorney Brien McMahon.

Republican nomination

Candidates
John A. Danaher, incumbent Senator since 1939

Convention
Senator Danaher was re-nominated by acclamation at the August 8 convention in Hartford. In his acceptance speech, he accused President Roosevelt of attempting to institute "one-man government."

Democratic nomination

Candidates
Brien McMahon, attorney and former assistant to U.S. Attorney General Homer Cummings

Convention
McMahon was nominated by acclamation at the August 5 convention in Hartford.

General election

Candidates
Spencer Anderson (Socialist)
Brien McMahon, attorney and former assistant to U.S. Attorney General Homer Cummings (Democratic)
John A. Danaher, incumbent Senator since 1939 (Republican)

Results

See also 
 1944 United States Senate elections

References 

1944
Connecticut
United States Senate